Puerto Rico Highway 195 (PR-195) is a road located in Fajardo, Puerto Rico, passing through its downtown. This highway begins at PR-3 west of downtown Fajardo and ends at the Port of Fajardo.

Major intersections

See also

 List of highways numbered 195

References

External links
 

195
Fajardo, Puerto Rico